João Henrique is a given name. Notable people with the name include:

 Andrade (footballer, born 1981) (born 1981), Brazilian footballer
 João Tomás (born 1975), Portuguese footballer
 João Henrique (footballer, born 1987), João Henrique da Silva, Brazilian football forward
 João Henrique (composer), Portuguese score composer

Masculine given names